Jim Davis (born Marlin Davis; August 26, 1909 – April 26, 1981) was an American actor, best known for his roles in television Westerns. In his later career, he became famous as Jock Ewing in the CBS primetime soap opera, Dallas, a role he continued until he was too ill from a terminal illness to perform.

Life and career
Born in Edgerton in Platte County in northwestern Missouri, Davis attended high school in Dearborn, and the Baptist-affiliated William Jewell College in Liberty. At WJC, he played tight end on the football team and graduated with a degree in political science. He served in the United States Coast Guard during World War II.

He was known as Jim Davis by the time of his first major screen role, which was opposite Bette Davis in the 1948 melodrama Winter Meeting,. His subsequent film career consisted of mostly B movies, many of them Westerns, although he made an impression as a U.S. Senator in the Warren Beatty conspiracy thriller The Parallax View. 

Davis appeared 13 times on Death Valley Days. In 1954–1955, Davis starred and narrated Stories of the Century. He portrayed Matt Clark, a detective for the Southwest Railroad. In 1957 he played an outlaw with scruples in the 16th episode of Tales of Wells Fargo, entitled "Two Cartridges", with Dale Robertson.

From 1958-1960, Davis starred as Wes Cameron opposite Lang Jeffries in the role of Skip Johnson in the syndicated adventure series Rescue 8. About this time, he guest-starred on the syndicated crime drama, U.S. Marshal, starring John Bromfield.

Davis made two guest appearances on Perry Mason, as George Tabor in the season-six episode of "The Case of the Fickle Filly", and as murder victim Joe Farrell in the 1964, season-eight episode of "The Case of a Place Called Midnight". He also appeared on the Jack Lord adventure series, Stoney Burke. In 1964, Davis played Wyatt Earp in the episode "After the OK Corral" on Death Valley Days; William Tannen played the part of rancher and gunfighter Ike Clanton in the same episode.

Davis appeared 11 times on Gunsmoke and four times each on Daniel Boone, Wagon Train, and Laramie. In the next-to-the-last Laramie episode, entitled "Trapped" (May 14, 1963), he guest-starred with Tommy Sands, Claude Akins, and Mona Freeman. In the story line, Slim Sherman (John Smith) finds an injured female kidnap victim in the woods (Freeman). Dennis Holmes, as series-regular Mike Williams, rides away to seek help, but the kidnappers reclaim the hostage. Slim pursues the kidnappers, but is mistaken as a third kidnapper by the girl's father (Barton MacLane). Sands plays the girl's boyfriend, who had been ordered by her father to stop seeing her. Davis also appeared in an episode of The High Chaparral and in small roles in the 1971 John Wayne vehicles Rio Lobo (1970) and  Big Jake (1971).  
 
In 1974, he starred as Marshal Bill Winter in a short-lived ABC Western series The Cowboys, based on a 1972 film of the same name starring John Wayne.

Dallas and last years
After years of relatively low-profile roles, Davis was cast as family patriarch Jock Ewing on Dallas, which debuted in 1978.

During the recording of season four, he was diagnosed with multiple myeloma, but continued to film the show as long as he could. In many scenes as the season progressed, he was shown seated, and his voice became softer and more obviously affected by his illness. He also wore a wig during the season's latter episodes to conceal his hair loss from chemotherapy. 

A season-four storyline regarding the Takapa development and Jock's separation from Miss Ellie was ended abruptly near the end of the season. The writers depicted the couple suddenly leaving to go on an extended second honeymoon in Europe when  Davis obviously could no longer continue to work. Their departure in a limousine in the episode "New Beginnings" was Davis' only scene in that episode, and his condition was so poor that close watching reveals (based on his unsynchronized lip movement) that he overdubbed his one last line of dialogue. It was his final appearance on the show; he was absent from the final two episodes of season four. 

He died of complications from his illness while season four was being aired. 

The decision had already been made prior to Davis' death not to recast the character with another actor. Furthermore, after he died the producers strongly considered leaving his name and photos in the opening credits for the duration of the series.

The Jock Ewing character remained alive off-screen after Davis' death for the last two episodes of season four and the first 12 episodes of season five. 

The season-five storyline was that Jock and Ellie stopped briefly in Washington, D.C., on their way home to Dallas from their second honeymoon so that Jock could take care of some Ewing Oil-related legislative business. While they were there, the State Department asked Jock to go to South America to drill for oil, and Jock relished the opportunity to relive his wildcatting days, when he first made his fortune in Texas during the Depression. Ellie returned to Dallas, and she and other characters were occasionally shown speaking to him on the telephone when he would call from South America to check on the family. 

The fifth-season episode "The Search", which confirmed the character's death in a helicopter crash on his way home to Dallas from South America, was broadcast on January 8, 1982, and contained flashback scenes of the character.

A portrait of Davis in his role as Jock Ewing often appeared as a memorial on Dallas after his death.

Personal life 

In 1949, after two short failed marriages, he met Blanche Hammerer (1918–2009) at the club "Mocambo" on the Sunset Strip. They later married and remained together for more than 30 years, until Davis's death in 1981.

Their only child, daughter Tara Diane Davis (January 15, 1953 – February 9, 1970), was killed in an automobile accident at the age of 17. Davis later became close to his Dallas co-star Victoria Principal, who had a physical resemblance to his late daughter.

Death
Davis died at his home in Northridge, California, on April 26, 1981, aged 71. He is interred at Forest Lawn Memorial Park Cemetery in Glendale, California.

Recognition 
In February 1960, having already appeared as a guest star on 50 episodes across 20 different television series and having been the series lead of both Stories of the Century and Rescue 8, Davis received a star on the Hollywood Walk of Fame, at 6290 Hollywood Boulevard, Hollywood, California.

Filmography

References

External links

 Jim Davis Memorial Page
 
 

1909 births
1981 deaths
Male actors from Missouri
American male film actors
American male soap opera actors
American male television actors
Deaths from brain cancer in the United States
Deaths from multiple myeloma
People from Platte County, Missouri
People from Greater Los Angeles
Burials at Forest Lawn Memorial Park (Glendale)
20th-century American male actors
Western (genre) television actors
United States Coast Guard personnel of World War II